Hash House Bikers (also known as bike hashers, or bashers) is an international group of non-competitive bicycling, social, and drinking clubs referred to as chapters or kennels. An event organized by a kennel is known as a bike bash or bash, with participants often calling themselves bashers. Bike hashing is an offshoot of the popular Hash House Harriers running club.

Singapore Bike Hash has solid claim to be the first and oldest running Bike Hash chapter or kennel in the world, having started in July 1989 and extant today. Bangkok Hash House Bikers is not far behind being formed in 1992 and attracting strong contingent every month.

The Orlando Bike-O-Psycho bike hash started in June 1991 when Don Burlinson, aka Missing Link, ran a O2H3 run hash when a non-running hasher, Curser, did the hash on a bike. Burlinson had an ah-ha moment and thought how fun to do this on a bike. He collaborated with two hashers who were proprietors of a local bike shop, Cycle Path, and started the bash; the first bike hash kennel in the western hemisphere.

References

External links
 America
 North America
 Bike-O-Psycho Orlando  
 Savannah Bash
 Atlanta Bike Hash
 Lost Hares Society H3 (Melbourne, FL)
 Pedalfiles Bike Hash
 Phoenix PB3 Crank Wankers
 Asia
 Laos
 Laos Bicycle Hash
 Singapore
 Singapore Bike Hash
 Malaysia
 Kuala Lumpur Mountain Bike Hash
 Malacca Mountain Bike Hash
 Thailand
 Bangkok Hash House Bikers
 Phuket Mountain Bike Hash
 Europe
 United Kingdom
 London Bike Hash
 Cambridge Randomly Active Bike Hash (CRABs)
 Oceania
 Australia
 The Sydney Bike Hash

Cycling clubs